Section 287(g) of the U.S. Immigration and Nationality Act authorizes the Department of Homeland Security (DHS) to deputize selected state and local law enforcement officers to enforce federal immigration law. Section 287(g) allows the DHS and law enforcement agencies to make agreements, which require the state and local officers to receive training and work under the supervision of U.S. Immigration and Customs Enforcement. ICE provides the officers with authorization to identify, process, and—when appropriate—detain immigration offenders they encounter during their regular, daily law-enforcement activity.

Implementation 

ICE currently requires participating officers to undergo a four-week training process. Of 15,338 local police and sheriff offices in the United States, only 37 participated in 287(g) as of March 2017. Local officials who have chosen not to participate or discontinued the program cite as their reasons program costs, disruptions to their relationship with local residents, bad publicity, and a desire to focus on criminal law enforcement as opposed to federal civil laws including immigration laws. Between 2006 and 2015, over 402,000 immigrants were identified for deportation through § 287(g).

History 

287(g) programs were originally used to deport criminals who were screened while in jail. Then, in 2006, officers under the sheriff of Charlotte, North Carolina, Jim Pendergraph, began screening the public for violations of civil immigration law. This began the "task force model" of 287(g) in addition to the original jail-based model. Pendergraph was later appointed chief of ICE's Office of State and Local Coordination, and in this position he expanded the task force model to other communities. At the close of 2012, ICE reported that it had decided to discontinue its agreements under the task force model, saying that "other enforcement programs, including Secure Communities, are a more efficient use of resources." Participation of localities in the 287(g) program reduced from a peak of 72 localities in 2011 to 37 in March 2017. Chris Newman, National Day Laborer Organizing Network's legal director, reported in early 2017 that he thought the 287(g) program was coming to a close. However, Donald Trump asked the Department of Homeland Security to build more 287(g) partnerships in a January 2017 executive order. Commentators speculate that his planned expansion includes a return to the "task force" model. Subsequently, a number of sheriffs requested to join the 287(g) program in the early months of the Trump administration.

Civil rights violations 

The US Justice Department has found that some localities participating in the 287(g) program have used their authority to commit large scale pattern or practice constitutional violations. For example, Maricopa, Arizona Sheriff Joe Arpaio used his authority under § 287(g) to justify sweeps during which Latinos were illegally racially profiled. Muzaffar Chishti of the Migration Policy Institute described the situation there by saying, "there were people in yellow suits running around catching Hispanics."
In Alamance County, NC, sheriff's deputies established checkpoints at entrances to Latino neighborhoods where Latino drivers were ten times more likely to be stopped than non-Latino drivers. It was also found that for the same traffic violations, Latino drivers were frequently arrested, whereas non-Latino drivers merely received citations. In February 2017, the ACLU cited numerous instances of civil rights violations, patterns of racial discrimination, and patterns of improper behavior among § 287(g) participating localities, and urged ICE to discontinue the program on the grounds that these localities could not be trusted to attend to constitutional and civil rights.

Support and opposition 

The National Sheriffs' Association has issued a position paper supporting the expansion of the 287(g) program, stating: "It is critical that local law enforcement maintain and build upon the partnerships with federal law enforcement to ensure that collectively we can promote, protect, and preserve the public safety and homeland security."
The International Association of Chiefs of Police and the Major Cities Chiefs Association have both issued statements opposing police participation in immigration enforcement on the grounds that it interferes with the "trust, communication, and cooperation" between police and the immigrant community that are necessary for police to maintain public order. The Law Enforcement Immigration Task Force, composed of 63 sheriffs and police chiefs signed a letter asserting that they don't want their officers acting as immigration enforcement agents. 287(g) has also been strongly opposed by the ACLU, the American Immigration Council, and the Southern Center for Human Rights.

See also 
 Illegal immigration to the United States
 Immigration policy of Donald Trump
 Office of Victims of Immigration Crime Engagement
 Jessica Colotl controversy
 Sanctuary city#United States

Notes

References

External links 
 List of participating agencies, and PDF of all signed 287(g) agreements
 ACLU statements and news on 287(g)
 American Immigration Council webpage on 287(g)
 ICE Fact Sheet on 287(g)
 
 
 
 
 

History of immigration to the United States
Illegal immigration to the United States
U.S. Immigration and Customs Enforcement
United States immigration law